Montesierra will be a street level stop of line 2 of the Seville Metro. The station will be located within the Industrial park known as Polígono Industrial Carretera Amarilla, close to Montesierra Av. Construction works will begin in late 2011, and the station is expected to be operational during 2017.

Future services

See also
 List of Seville metro stations

References

External links 
  Official site.
  Map of Line 2 project
 History, construction details and maps.

Seville Metro stations
Railway stations in Spain opened in 2017